This is an incomplete list of Oklahoma state agencies. The state agencies make up the machinery of government for the state. All agencies are within one of the three branches of the government of Oklahoma. Pursuant to the provisions of the Executive Branch Reform Act of 1986, all executive branch agencies are organized under a Cabinet Secretary.

Executive Branch

The executive branch of government is headed by the Governor of Oklahoma, who is assisted in managing the executive branch by Cabinet Secretaries appointed by the Governor with the consent of the Oklahoma Senate. The Lieutenant Governor of Oklahoma serves as President of the Senate and is first in line to succeed to the Governorship in the event of a vacancy. The role the Lieutenant Governor performs in the executive branch is determined by the Governor. The Governor may appoint the Lieutenant Governor as a Cabinet Secretary.

State-wide elected officials and major state departments are bolded
Cabinet Secretary have no authority over state-wide elected officials and are only listed for liaison purposes

Secretary of State

Office of the Secretary of State
Oklahoma Council on Judicial Complaints
Oklahoma State Election Board
Oklahoma Ethics Commission
Oklahoma Judicial Nominating Commission

Secretary of Agriculture
Advisors on Oklahoma Feed Yards Act
All Commodity Commissions
Boll Weevil Eradication Organization
Oklahoma Conservation Commission
Oklahoma Department of Agriculture, Food, and Forestry
State Board of Agriculture (governing body of Department)
State Bureau of Standards
Agriculture Enhancement and Diversification Advisory Board
Apiary Advisory Committee
Concentrated Animal Feeding Operations Act Rule Advisory Committee
Forestry Cost-share Advisory Committee
Registered Poultry Feeding Operations Act Rule Advisory Committee
Fire Protection Compact and Advisory Commission
Peanut Commission
Pecan Marketing Board
Sheep and Wool Commission
Sorghum Commission
South Central Interstate Forest
State Board of Registration for Foresters
Wheat Commission

Secretary of Commerce and Tourism
Commerce entities—
Office of the Labor Commissioner
Oklahoma Department of Labor
All Sub-State Planning Districts
Workforce Investment Boards
Black Advisory Task Force
Oklahoma Department of Commerce
Office for Minority and Disadvantaged Business Enterprises
Small Business Regulatory Review Committee
Task Force on Oklahoma Illegal Immigration Issues
Native American Cultural and Educational Authority
East Central Oklahoma Building Authority
Kiamichi Development Authority
Mid-South Industrial Authority
Midwestern Oklahoma Development Authority
Oklahoma Capital Investment Board
Oklahoma Development Finance Authority
Oklahoma Employment Security Commission
Oklahoma Firemen’s Building Authority
Oklahoma Housing Finance Agency
Oklahoma Industrial Finance Authority
Oklahoma Municipal Power Authority Board
Oklahoma Ordnance Works Authority
Southeastern Oklahoma Industries Authority
Southern Growth Policies Board
Southern Oklahoma Development Trust
Tourism entities—
Oklahoma Department of Tourism and Recreation
Oklahoma Tourism and Recreation Commission (governing body of Department)
Oklahoma Film and Music Advisory Commission
Oklahoma Tourism Promotion Advisory Committee
Governor’s Commission for Oklahoma Artisans
Historic Preservation Review Committee
Historical Records Advisory Board
J.M. Davis Memorial Commission
Oklahoma Capitol Complex and Centennial Commemoration Commission
Oklahoma Historical Society
Oklahoma Jazz Hall of Fame
Oklahoma Memorial Committee
Oklahoma Sam Noble Museum of Natural History
Oklahoma Scenic Rivers Commission
State Geographer
State Register of Natural Heritage Areas
Will Rogers Memorial Commission

Secretary of Education
Office of the Superintendent of Public Instruction
Anatomical Board
Arts Council
Board of Private Vocation School
Commission for Teacher Preparation
Oklahoma State Department of Education
Oklahoma Department of Libraries
Oklahoma Department of Career and Technology Education
Oklahoma Educational Television Authority
Medical Technology and Research Authority
Student Loan Authority
Oklahoma School of Science and Mathematics
Oklahoma State System of Higher Education
State Regents for Higher Education (governing body of System)
Board of Regents for Oklahoma Agricultural and Mechanical Colleges
Connors State College
Langston University
Northeastern Oklahoma A&M College
Oklahoma Panhandle State University
Oklahoma State University
Board of Regents for the University of Oklahoma
Cameron University
Rogers State University
University of Oklahoma
Board of Regents of Oklahoma Colleges
University of Central Oklahoma
East Central University
Southwestern Oklahoma State University
Southeastern Oklahoma State University
Northwestern Oklahoma State University
Northeastern State University
Carl Albert State College
Eastern Oklahoma State College
Redlands Community College
Murray State College
Northern Oklahoma College
Oklahoma City Community College
Rogers University
Rose State College
Seminole State College
Tulsa Community College
University of Science and Arts of Oklahoma
Western Oklahoma State College

Secretary of Energy
Office of the Oklahoma Secretary of Energy
Oklahoma Bioenergy Center
Oklahoma Corporation Commission
Oklahoma Department of Mines
Oklahoma Mining Commission (governing body of Department)
Oklahoma Miner Training Institute
East Central Gas Authority
Grand River Dam Authority
GRDA Board of Directors
GRDA Board of Directors Nominating Committee
Oklahoma Marginal Wells Commission
Interstate Mining Commission
Interstate Oil and Gas Compact Commission
Liquefied Petroleum Gas Board
LPG Research, Marketing, and Safety Commission
North Central Oklahoma Municipal Power Pool Authority
Oklahoma Energy Resources Board
Southern States Energy Board
Southern States Energy Compact

Secretary of the Environment
Office of the Oklahoma Secretary of the Environment
Oklahoma Department of Environmental Quality
Environmental Quality Board (governing body of Department)
Air Quality Advisory Council
Central Interstate Low-Level Radioactive Waste Compact Commission
Hazardous Waste Management Advisory Council
Laboratory Services Advisory Council
Radiation Management Advisory Council
Small Business Compliance Advisory Panel
Solid Waste Management Advisory Council
Water Quality Management Advisory Council
Waterworks and Wastewater Works Advisory Council
Oklahoma Department of Wildlife Conservation
Wildlife Conservation Commission (governing body of Department)
High Plains Study Council and Task Force
Illinois River Task Force
Lone Chimney Water Association
Oklahoma Water Research Institute
Governor’s Water Resources Research Coordinating Committee
Oklahoma Water Resources Board
Arkansas-Oklahoma Arkansas River Compact Commission
Arkansas River Basin Interstate Committee
Arkansas-White-Red River Basins Interagency Commission
Canadian River Commission
Kansas-Oklahoma Arkansas River Compact Commission
Red River Compact Commission
Water Law Advisory Committee
Ottawa Reclamation Authority

Secretary of Finance and Revenue
Office of the Insurance Commissioner
Oklahoma Department of Insurance
Office of the State Auditor and Inspector
Office of the State Treasurer
Advisory Task Force on Sale of School Lands
Advisory Committee on Intergovernmental Relations
Board of Trustees of Teachers’ Retirement System
Oklahoma Board on Legislative Compensation
Building Bonds Commission
Capitol Improvement Authority
Oklahoma Commissioners of the Land Office
CompSource Oklahoma (formerly State Insurance Fund)
CompSource Board of Managers
Contingency Review Board
Credit Union Board
Oklahoma Department of Consumer Credit
Commission on Consumer Credit (governing body of Department)
Oklahoma Department of Securities
Oklahoma Securities Commission (governing body of Department)
Executive Bond Oversight Commission
Oklahoma Firefighters Pension and Retirement System
Firefighters Pension and Retirement Board
Fund Board of Investors
Industry Advisory Committee
Law Enforcement Retirement Board
Life and Health Insurance Guaranty Association
Linked Deposit Review Board
Multiple Injury Trust Fund
Oklahoma Office of State Finance
Oklahoma College Savings Plan Board of Trustees
Oklahoma Commissioners of the Land Office
Oklahoma State Pension Commission
Oklahoma Public Employees Retirement System
Public Employees Retirement Board
Oklahoma Tax Commission
Oklahoma Police Pension and Retirement System
Police Pension and Retirement Board
Property and Casualty Insurance Guaranty Association
Property and Casualty Rates Board
Special Agency Account Board
Oklahoma State Banking Department
Oklahoma State Banking Board (governing body of Department)
Oklahoma State Board of Equalization
Oklahoma State Bond Advisor
Council of Bond Oversight
Long-Range Capital Planning Commission
Oklahoma Teachers’ Retirement System
Teachers' Retirement Board
Tobacco Settlement Endowment Trust

Secretary of Health and Human Services
Health entities—
Community Hospitals Authority
Construction Industries Board
Committee of Electrical Examiners
Committee of Mechanical Examiners
Committee of Plumbing Examiners
Electrical Hearing Board
Electrical Installation Code Variance and Appeals Board
Inspector Examiners Committee
Mechanical Hearing Board
Mechanical Installation Code Variance and Appeals Board
Plumbing Hearing Board
Plumbing Installation Code Variance and Appeals Board
Oklahoma State Department of Health
State Board of Health (governing body of Department)
Advisory Council on Traumatic Spinal Cord and Traumatic Brain Injury
Agent Orange Outreach Committee
Alarm Industry Committee
Alzheimer’s Research Advisory Council
State Barber Advisory Board
Breast Cancer Prevention and Treatment Advisory Committee
Boxing Advisory Committee
Office of Child Abuse Prevention
Interagency Child Abuse Prevention Task Force
Child Abuse Training and Coordination Council
Childhood Lead Poisoning Prevention Advisory Council
Licensed Professional Counselors Advisory Board
Driver’s License Medical Advisory Committee
Emergency Response Systems Development Advisory Council
Governor’s Advisory Committee on Aging
Health Care Information Advisory Committee
Hearing Aid Advisory Council
Home Health Advisory Board
Hospice Advisory Council
Long-Term Care Facility Advisory Board
Licensed Professional Counselors Advisory Board
Licensed Marital and Family Therapists Advisory Board
Medical Audit Committee
Medical Direction Subcommittee
Organ Donor Education and Awareness Program Advisory Council
Internagency Council  on Osteoporosis
Radiation Advisory Committee
Residents and Family State Council
Sanitarian and Environmental Specialist Registration Advisory Council
Vision Screening Standards Advisory Committee
Edercare Program Advisory Committee
Oklahoma Department of Mental Health and Substance Abuse Services
State Board of Mental Health and Substance Abuse Services (governing body of Department)
Advisory Council on Alcohol and Drug Abuse
Alcohol and Drug Abuse Prevention and Life Skills Education Advisory Council
Alcohol and Drug Abuse Prevention, Training, Treatment  and Rehabilitation Authority
Alcohol, Drug Abuse and Community Mental Health Planning and Coordination Boards
Office of Consumer Advocacy
Forensics Review Board
Mental Health Advisory Committee on Deafness and Hearing Impairment
Office of Consumer Advocacy (MHSAS)
Oklahoma Health Care Authority
Advisory Committee for Medical Care for Public Assistance Recipients
Health Care Study Commission
State Board of Examiners for Long-Term Care Administrators
Oklahoma Tobacco Settlement Endowment Trust
Tobacco Settlement Endowment Trust Board of Directors (governing body of Trust)
Tobacco Settlement Endowment Trust Board of Investors
Human Services entities—
Cerebral Palsy Commission
J.D. McCarty Center for Children with Developmental Disabilities
Commission on Children and Youth
Advisory Task Force on Child Abuse and Neglect
Child Abuse Examination Board
Child Abuse Prevention Office
Child Abuse Prevention Training and Coordination Council
Child Death Review Board
Planning and Coordinating Council for Services to Children and Youth
Office of Juvenile Systems Oversight
Group Homes/Developmentally Disabled or Physically Handicapped Persons
Interdisciplinary Council on the Prevention of Juvenile Sex Offenses
Oklahoma Department of Human Services
Commission for Human Services (governing body of department)
Developmental Disabilities Council
Governor’s Advisory Committee on Aging
Office of Faith-based and Community Initiatives
Office of Public Guardian
Oklahoma Department of Rehabilitation Services
Commission for Rehabilitation Services (governing body of department)
Committee of Blind Vendors
Committee on Employment of the Handicapped
Governor's Advisory Committee on Handicapped Concerns
Statewide Independent Living Council
Indian Affairs Commission
Office of Disability Concerns
Oklahoma Office of Juvenile Affairs
Board of Juvenile Affairs
Physician Manpower Training Commission
University Hospitals Authority and Trust

Secretary of Human Resources and Administration
Accountancy Board
Alternative Fuels Technician Examiners Hearing Board
Architects and Landscape Architects Board
Athletic Trainers Advisory Committee
Board of Licensed Social Workers
Certified Public Manager Advisory Board
Chiropractic Examiners Board
Dentistry Board
Oklahoma Department of Central Services
State Capitol Preservation Commission
Oklahoma Capitol Improvement Authority
Capitol-Medical Center Improvement and Zoning Commission and Citizens Advisory Committee
State Use Committee
Public Employees Relations Board
Dietetic Registration Advisory Committee
Electrologists Advisory Committee
Embalmers and Funeral Directors Board
Engineers and Land Surveyors, Board of Registration
Horse Racing Commission
Human Rights Commission
Medical Licensure and Supervision Board
Oklahoma Merit Protection Commission
Motor Vehicle Commission
Nurse Anesthetist Formulary Advisory Council
Nurse Formulary Advisory Council
Nursing Board and Advisory Council
Occupational Therapy Advisory Committee
Oklahoma Office of Personnel Management
Affirmative Action Review Council
Governor’s Advisory Council on Asian-American Affairs
Governor’s Advisory Council on Latin American and Hispanic Affairs
Governor's Ethnic American Advisory Council
Committee for Incentive Awards for State Employees
Mentor Selection Advisory Committee
Oversight Committee for State Employee Charitable Contributions
Employee Assistance Program Advisory Council
Oklahoma Commission on the Status of Women
Optometry Examiners Board
Osteopathic Examiners Board
Perfusionists Board of Examiners
Pharmacy Board
Physical Therapy Committee
Physician’s Assistant Advisory Committee
Podiatric Medical Examiners Board
Psychologist Board of Examiners
Real Estate Appraiser Board
Real Estate Commission
Respiratory Care Advisory Committee
Sanitarian Registration Advisory Council
Savings & Loan Advisory Council
Speech Pathology and Audiology Board of Examiners
State Board of Cosmetology
State Employee Child Day Care Advisory Committee
State Employees Benefits Council
State/Education Employees Group Insurance Board
Used Motor Vehicle & Parts Commission
Veterinary Medical Examiners Board

Secretary of the Military
Adjutant General of Oklahoma
Oklahoma Department of the Military

Secretary of Safety and Security
Attorney General of Oklahoma
Office of the Attorney General
Alcoholic Beverage Laws Enforcement Commission
Council on Firefighter Training
Council on Law Enforcement Education and Training
Polygraph Examiners Board
Bureau of Narcotics and Dangerous Drugs Control
Department of Corrections
State Board of Corrections (governing body of Department)
Board of Directors for Canteen Services
Department of Emergency Management
Emergency Management Advisory Council
Hazardous Materials Emergency Response Commission
Department of Public Safety
Board of Tests for Alcohol and Drug Influence
Driver’s License Compact
Driver’s License Medical Advisory Committee
Oklahoma Office of Homeland Security
Oklahoma Highway Patrol
Oklahoma Highway Safety Office
District Attorneys Council
Indigent Defense System
Indigent Defense System Board
Office of the Chief Medical Examiner
Office of State Fire Marshal
Pardon and Parole Board
State Bureau of Investigation

Secretary of Science and Technology
Oklahoma Archeological Survey
Oklahoma Biological Survey
Oklahoma Climatological Survey
Oklahoma Geological Survey
Oklahoma Center for the Advancement of Science and Technology
Governor's Science and Technology Council
Science and Technology Research and Development Board
Health Research Committee
Oklahoma Institute of Technology

Secretary of Transportation
Oklahoma Aeronautics Commission
All Port Authorities
Oklahoma Department of Transportation
Highway Construction Materials Technician Certification Board
Tourism Signage Advisory Task Force
Trucking Advisory Board
Waterways Advisory Board
Oklahoma Space Industry Development Authority
Oklahoma Turnpike Authority

Secretary of Veterans Affairs
Oklahoma Department of Veterans Affairs
Oklahoma War Veterans Commission (governing body of Department)

Legislative Branch
Board on Legislative Compensation
Legislative Service Bureau
Oklahoma Criminal Justice Resource Center

Judicial Branch

Board of Judicial Compensation
Council on Judicial Complaints
Oklahoma Judicial Nominating Commission

See also
List of United States federal agencies
Government of Oklahoma

External links
Department of Libraries PDF of state agencies
Department of Libraries alpha list of state agencies

States Agencies

Oklahoma